Joseph R. Woodwell (1843 – 1911) was an American painter.

Biography
Woodwell was born on September 7, 1842 in Pittsburgh, Pennsylvania. He traveled to France where he studied with Charles Gleyre. He was associated with the Scalp Level Group painters in Pennsylvania. Woodwell was the father of the painter Johanna Woodwell Hailman.

Woodwell exhibited his work at the Carnegie International, the National Academy of Design, and the Pennsylvania Academy of the Fine Arts. He also exhibited at the 1876 Philadelphia Centennial Exposition and the 1893 Chicago World's Fair.

He died on May 30, 1911 in Pittsburgh.

Woodwell's work is included in the collection of the Carnegie Museum of Art. His letters are in the Archives of American Art at Smithsonian Institution.

References

External links

images of Woodwell's work from Carnegie Museum of Art
Artwork by Joseph R. Woodwell

1843 births 
1911 deaths 
20th-century American artists